Lima is an unincorporated community and census-designated place (CDP) in Middletown Township, Delaware County, Pennsylvania, United States. The population was 2,735 at the 2010 census, down from 3,225 at the 2000 census. It is pronounced "LYE-ma" (/ˈɫaɪ-mə/).

History
The Middletown Friends Meetinghouse was built in 1702 and is one of the oldest Friends meetinghouses in what was originally Chester County. Lima played an important role in the anti-slavery movement. Not only did residents advocate for manumission, noted local families such as the Van Leer's and Fox's bought and sold lots to free black tradesmen or only to people who were supportive of the free black community. The location was known as The Village of Lima and is now known as Van Leer Avenue. The local community grew with support from local neighbors.

The John J. Tyler Arboretum was listed on the National Register of Historic Places in 2003.

Geography
Lima is located in northern Middletown Township at  (39.916523, -75.441902). U.S. Route 1 (Baltimore Pike) forms the southern edge of the CDP and leads northeast  into Philadelphia.

It has a hot-summer humid continental climate and average monthly temperatures in the village centre range from 31.7 °F in January to 76.5 °F in July. The local hardiness zone is 7a.

Demographics

As of the census of 2000, there were 3,225 people, 978 households, and 400 families residing in the CDP. The population density was 2,221.7 people per square mile (858.7/km). There were 1,003 housing units at an average density of 691.0/sq mi (267.1/km). The racial makeup of the CDP was 94.23% White, 4.53% African American, 0.03% Native American, 0.99% Asian, and 0.22% from two or more races. Hispanic or Latino of any race were 0.31% of the population.

There were 978 households, out of which 10.9% had children under the age of 18 living with them, 34.4% were married couples living together, 5.2% had a female householder with no husband present, and 59.0% were non-families. 57.5% of all households were made up of individuals, and 52.4% had someone living alone who was 65 years of age or older. The average household size was 1.69 and the average family size was 2.63.

In the CDP, the population was spread out, with 8.1% under the age of 18, 1.6% from 18 to 24, 8.0% from 25 to 44, 11.3% from 45 to 64, and 71.1% who were 65 years of age or older. The median age was 79 years. For every 100 females, there were 48.9 males. For every 100 females age 18 and over, there were 43.8 males.

The median income for a household in the CDP was $45,948, and the median income for a family was $65,875. Males had a median income of $49,750 versus $40,804 for females. The per capita income for the CDP was $24,908. About 1.6% of families and 4.7% of the population were below the poverty line, including none of those under age 18 and 4.1% of those age 65 or over.

Notable residents
Holly Witt, Playboy Playmate Miss November 1995
John P. Van Leer, Anti-Slavery Movement member and colonel in the civil war

References

Census-designated places in Delaware County, Pennsylvania
Census-designated places in Pennsylvania